54th parallel may refer to:

54th parallel north, a circle of latitude in the Northern Hemisphere
54th parallel south, a circle of latitude in the Southern Hemisphere